Mid-Flinx (1995) is a science fiction novel  by American writer Alan Dean Foster. The book is the sixth chronologically in the Pip and Flinx series.

Plot introduction
As the story opens, Flinx is at loose ends, looking for peace and quiet on a backwater world. But the local bully takes a shine to Flinx's longtime companion, an empathic and poisonous flying snake, or minidrag, and insists on buying it.

When the situation becomes life-threatening, Flinx and his snake, Pip, flee the planet, instructing the space ship to fly into random uncharted space. The ship takes them to a supposedly undiscovered planet, covered with jungle a mile thick. Flinx exits his lander - and is nearly killed by a huge, transparent flying creature.

But something draws him on to explore this lush and beautiful world where the flowers have hidden teeth and even the water may reach up and grab you; for the first time in years, his headaches are gone. Risking death with every cautious step, he is finally rescued from a most ingenious botanical predator by a band of humans - descendants of a lost colony ship long forgotten. Flinx has a liaison with one of them.

These humans have companions, not pets, but apparently native creatures whose lives are bound inextricably (unto death) with their particular human. And they and the humans have some sort of peculiar empathic relationship with the planet - more significantly, with the plant life. While it does not become obvious until future novels, the empathic nature of Midworld is vital to allowing Flinx to accomplish his ultimate task.

Meanwhile, Flinx's enemies are hot on his trail—no sooner is one set apparently neutralized than another appears.

External links

Alan Dean Foster homepage

1995 American novels
1995 science fiction novels
American science fiction novels
Humanx Commonwealth
Novels by Alan Dean Foster
Sequel novels
Del Rey books